Gregory Roy Williamson is the mayor of North Queensland's Mackay Regional Council, a position he has held since 2016.

Before entering politics, Williamson was a radio announcer for Mackay's local 4MK radio station. Williamson started his political career as an alderman of what was then the Mackay City Council in the 1980s. He oversaw the amalgamation of the city and shire councils in 1994.

Williamson first served as Mackay's mayor from 1991 to 1994 before going into business and then returning to public office in 2016. Williamson is a fifth generation Mackay local and has over 35 years of service with the Australian Air Force Cadets.

In October 2019, The New York Times profiled Williamson's planting, outreach, and education efforts to protect his community from the negative effects of climate change as part of a growing trend of small-town mayors hoping to affect change at the local level.

References 

Living people
Queensland local councillors
Businesspeople from Queensland
21st-century Australian politicians
Mayors of places in Queensland
Year of birth missing (living people)